Justice Fisk may refer to:

Charles J. Fisk, associate justice of the North Dakota Supreme Court
Isaac Fiske, associate justice of the Rhode Island Supreme Court
James Fisk (politician), associate justice of the Vermont Supreme Court